Zela is an unincorporated community in Nicholas County, West Virginia, United States.

The community was named after Zela Alderson, the daughter of a local merchant.

References

Unincorporated communities in Nicholas County, West Virginia
Unincorporated communities in West Virginia